Lugton railway station was a railway station serving the hamlet of Lugton, East Ayrshire, Scotland. The station was originally part of the Glasgow, Barrhead and Kilmarnock Joint Railway.

History
The station opened on 27 March 1871, and closed permanently to passengers on 7 November 1966.

Today the line still open as part of the Glasgow South Western Line.

Current operations
Today the line to Beith (now singled and heavily overgrown) is still in existence until just before the site of Barrmill railway station, where it then heads south along the original route of the Lanarkshire and Ayrshire Railway until it reaches DM Beith. DM Beith reportedly no longer require the rail connection and its removal at Lugton has allowed an extension of the proposed dynamic loop on the Glasgow South Western Line, which had been planned to run only between Dunlop and Stewarton stations. The loop allows half-hourly services to run between Glasgow and Kilmarnock.

The new 5 1/3-mile double-track loop portion was duly commissioned in September 2009, with the old Beith line disconnected as part of the work. The section is under the control of Lugton signal box and is designed for bi-directional operation.

References

Notes

Sources 
Butt, R.V.J. (1995). The Directory of Railway Stations, Patrick Stephens Ltd, Sparkford. .

Disused railway stations in East Ayrshire
Railway stations in Great Britain opened in 1871
Railway stations in Great Britain closed in 1966
Beeching closures in Scotland
Former Glasgow, Barrhead and Kilmarnock Joint Railway stations